The following elections were scheduled to occur in 2019. The International Foundation for Electoral Systems has a calendar of upcoming elections around the world, and the National Democratic Institute also maintains a calendar of elections in countries in which the organization works.

International
2019 United Nations Security Council election 7 June 2019

Africa

South Africa:
2019 Tshwane mayoral election 12 February 2019
2019 Gauteng provincial election 8 May 2019
2019 South African general election 8 May 2019
2019 Western Cape provincial election 8 May 2019
2019 Nigerian general election 23 February 2019
2019 Senegalese presidential election 24 February 2019
2019 Guinea-Bissau legislative election 10 March 2019
2019 Comorian presidential election 24 March 2019
2019 Egyptian constitutional referendum 19 to 22 April 2019
2019 Beninese parliamentary election 28 April 2019
2019 Malawian general election 21 May 2019
2019 Malagasy parliamentary election 27 May 2019
2019 Mauritanian presidential election 22 June 2019
Tunisia:
2019 Tunisian presidential election 15 September and 13 October 2019
2019 Tunisian parliamentary election 6 October 2019
2019 Mozambican general election 15 October 2019
2019 Botswana general election 23 October 2019
2019 Mauritian general election 7 November 2019
2019 Sidama Region referendum 20 November 2019
2019 Namibian general election 27 November 2019
2019 Guinea-Bissau presidential election 25 November and 29 December 2019
2019 Algerian presidential election 12 December 2019

Asia

Philippines:
2019 Bangsamoro autonomy plebiscite 21 January and 6 February 2019
2019 Philippine general election 13 May 2019
2019 Philippine House of Representatives elections 13 May 2019
2019 Philippine Senate election 13 May 2019
2019 Philippine gubernatorial elections 13 May 2019
2019 North Korean parliamentary election 10 March 2019
2019 Taiwanese by-elections 16 March 2019
2019 Thai general election 24 March 2019
2019 South Korean by-elections 3 April 2019
2019 Maldivian parliamentary election 6 April 2019
2019 Indian general election 11 April to 19 May 2019
2019 Indonesian general election 17 April 2019
2019 Kazakh presidential election 9 June 2019
2019 Japanese House of Councillors election 21 July 2019
2019 Afghan presidential election 28 September 2019
2019 Sri Lankan presidential election  16 November 2019
2019 Hong Kong local elections 24 November 2019

Europe

Switzerland:
2019 Swiss referendums 10 February and 19 May 2019
2019 Swiss federal election 20 October 2019
2019 Moldovan parliamentary election 24 February 2019
2019 Sardinian regional election 24 February 2019
2019 Estonian parliamentary election 3 March 2019
2019 Maltese presidential election 5 March 2019
2019 Slovak presidential election 16 and 30 March 2019
2019 Dutch provincial elections 20 March 2019
2019 Turkish local elections 31 March 2019
June 2019 Istanbul mayoral election 23 June 2019
2019 Ukrainian presidential election 31 March and 21 April 2019
United Kingdom:
2019 By-elections to the House of Lords
2019 Newport West by-election 4 April 2019
2019 United Kingdom local elections 2 May 2019
2019 Peterborough by-election 6 June 2019
2019 Brecon and Radnorshire by-election 1 August 2019 
2019 United Kingdom general election 12 December 2019
Czech Republic:
2019 Prague 9 by-election 5 and 6 April 2019
Andorra:
2019 Andorran parliamentary election 7 April 2019
2019 Andorran local elections 15 December 2019
2019 Finnish parliamentary election 14 April 2019
2019 North Macedonian presidential election 21 April and 5 May 2019
Spain:
April 2019 Spanish general election, 28 April 2019
2019 Valencian regional election 28 April 2019
2019 Spanish local elections 26 May 2019
2019 Spanish regional elections 26 May 2019
November 2019 Spanish general election, 10 November 2019
2019 Lithuanian presidential election 12 May 2019 and 26 May 2019
2019 European Parliament election 23–26 May 2019
Ireland:
2019 Irish local elections 24 May 2019
2019 Irish divorce referendum 24 May 2019
Belgium:
2019 Belgian federal election 26 May 2019
2019 Belgian regional elections 26 May 2019
Greece:
2019 Greek local elections 26 May 2019 and 2 June 2019
2019 Greek legislative election 7 July 2019
2019 Latvian presidential election 29 May 2019
2019 Sammarinese referendum 2 June 2019
2019 Danish general election 5 June 2019
2019 Albanian local elections 30 June 2019
2019 Ukrainian parliamentary election 21 July 2019
Germany:
2019 Bremen state election 26 May 2019
Local elections in Baden-Württemberg, Bremen, Brandenburg, Hamburg, Mecklenburg-Vorpommern, Rheinland-Pfalz, Saarland, Sachsen, Saxony-Anhalt and Thuringia on  26 May 2019
2019 Saxony state election 1 September 2019
2019 Brandenburg state election 1 September 2019
2019 Thuringian state election 27 October 2019
Russia:
2019 By-elections to the State Duma, 8 September 2019
2019 Russian elections, 8 September 2019
2019 Norwegian local elections 9 September 2019
Portugal:
2019 Madeiran regional election 22 September 2019
2019 Portuguese legislative election 6 October 2019
2019 Austrian legislative election, 29 September 2019
2019 Kosovan parliamentary election 6 October 2019
2019 Polish parliamentary election 13 October 2019
2019 Gibraltar general election 17 October 2019
2019 Bulgarian local elections 27 October 2019
2019 Romanian presidential election 10 and 24 November 2019
2019 Belarusian parliamentary election 17 November 2019
2019 Croatian presidential election 22 December 2019 and 5 January 2020

North America

2019 Salvadoran presidential election 3 February 2019
2019 Cuban constitutional referendum, 24 February 2019
2019 British Virgin Islands general election, 25 February 2019 
Canada (selection):
30th Alberta general election 16 April 2019
2019 Prince Edward Island general election 23 April 2019
50th Newfoundland and Labrador general election 16 May 2019
42nd Manitoba general election 10 September 2019
43rd Canadian federal election 21 October 2019
2019 Panamanian general election 5 May 2019
2019 Belizean territorial dispute referendum 8 May 2019
2019 Guatemalan general election 16 June and 11 August 2019
United States (selection):
2019 United States gubernatorial elections 5 November 2019
2019 Montserratian general election 18 November 2019
2019 Dominican general election 6 December 2019

South America 
2019 Bolivian general election 20 October 2019
2019 Argentine general election 27 October 2019
2019 Uruguayan general election 27 October and 24 November 2019

Middle East
Israel:
April 2019 Israeli legislative election, 9 April 2019
September 2019 Israeli legislative election, 17 September 2019
2019 Emirati parliamentary election, 5 October 2019
2019 Omani general election, 27 October 2019

Oceania
Micronesia:
2019 Micronesian parliamentary election 5 March 2019
2019 Micronesian Constitutional Convention election 5 November 2019
Australia:
2019 New South Wales state election 23 March 2019
2019 Tasmanian Legislative Council periodic election 4 May 2019
2019 Australian federal election 18 May 2019
2019 Cocos (Keeling) Islands election 19 October 2019
2019 Solomon Islands general election 3 April 2019
2019 Nauruan parliamentary election 24 August 2019
2019 New Zealand local elections 12 October 2019
2019 Marshallese general election 18 November 2019
2019 Bougainvillean independence referendum 23 November 2019

References

 
2019
Elections